The PH 16 (German: Punkthochhaus mit 16 Geschossen (a skyscraper with 16 floors)) is a type of industrial housing in East Germany.

Construction
The PH 16 has 132 apartments, one or two small commercial units on the ground floor, as well as parking and trash rooms within the building. The development was primarily via two internal lifts and an H-shaped canal system on each floor, which served both 9 apartments. An achievable via a staircase Notbalkon served primarily as an escape route. Originally created next to the stairwell garbage disposals were operated infrequently.
Schematic floor plan of a PH 16

About 400 people lived in a fully leased building. The apartments were designed as one-, two-and three-bedroom apartments, the latter were about 60 m² in extent, and the building corners. They were placed in groups of three apartments on one floor together and mostly to the west, south and east aligned. In the north there was the emergency stairwell. Each group of three shared a special room as a storage area. At the outer ends of the development programs, there were instructors at the window and Notbalkone fire. Due to the design of the building, most apartments oriented towards only one direction, and therefore had only window in that direction.

Urban planning was the PH 16 - always built in groups of at least two buildings - a gateway or high point in the housing estates . With more than 50 meters high, it is one of the highest in the series-built prefabricated types of DDR .

Heritage

The PH 16 has all but disappeared from almost cities. Its basic structure left, leaving a reorganization or restructuring does not seem economically viable. If they were not preserved as an urban landmark, they have in recent years been dismantled by their owners.

Locations

Erfurt

 Erfurt, Johannesplatz (alle 5 erhalten)
 Rieth (4 von 6 erhalten, davon 2 unbewohnte Abrisshäuser)
 Juri-Gagarin-Ring (4 von 5 erhalten)

Magdeburg

Formerly of 25 buildings of the type PH-16 are redeveloped 13 buildings and 10 have been demolished. The other two buildings are not renovated and are currently empty. 1 of which is to be redeveloped in 2012. (As at 4 February 2012)

 Magdeburg Neustädter See (get 8 of 9, which restored 6, 2 renovated)
 Magdeburg Neustädter Feld (all 5 torn down)
 Magdeburg Milchweg (2, 1 renovated und 1 torn down)
 Magdeburg Stadtmitte (3, 1 renovated, 2 demolished)
 Magdeburg Universitäts-Campus (1 renovated ("Campus Tower", formerly called the Uni-Hochhaus)
 Magdeburg Werder (2 renovated)
 Magdeburg Leipziger Straße (3, 2 renovated, 1 torn down)

Leipzig

 Leipzig Grünau (5)
 Leipzig Schönefeld (5) 
 Leipzig Mockau (4)
 Leipzig, Straße des 18. Oktober (8)
 Leipzig, Musikviertel (3)
 Leipzig-Marienbrunn (both torn down)

Gera

 De-Smit-Straße 8 (all with new balconies)

Cherkasy, Ukraine

 Bulvar Shevchenka, 200 (1).

See also 
 List of high rise buildings in Leipzig

Notes

External links

Apartment types
Housing in Germany
Economy of East Germany